Binny Golf Club is a golf course located in Broxburn, West Lothian, Scotland.

History
Binny Golf Club was formed in April 2002 two years after the opening by Bernard Gallacher, of Oatridge Golf Course, which lies in the grounds of Binny Estate adjacent to East Binny House.

The name Binnie is thought to come from a local man named Willian Binnock, who was granted an estate by Robert The Bruce, for his brave effort in re-capturing the Castle of Linlithgow from the English in 1313. East Binny House and lands are the remains of that estate.

The present house was built circa 1800 by a naval captain, Mr Stewart who lived there with his wife Janet until they died circa 1880. They are buried in the mausoleum which is located close to the house.

The house eventually was left to the Sue Ryder foundation by the last owner/resident Mrs Annie Lang. Sue Ryder opened up a care centre in Binny House in 1987 and since then many parts of the estate have been sold to the Oatridge Agricultural College, including the site of the golf course. In February 2002 the Sue Ryder care centre was closed and is now owned by the Huntercombe Hospital.

The name Binny is also famous for the stone extracted from the six quarries in the area. The Binny Stone Quarries operated from 1790 until 1914 and was widely used in the construction of Edinburgh’s New Town.

In 1997 a temporary quarry was opened at Binny to extract 75 cubic metres of stone for the repair of the Scott Monument. After the work was completed the quarry was refilled and returned to farm land.

References

External links

Golf clubs and courses in West Lothian
West Lothian
2002 establishments in Scotland
Sports venues completed in 2002